George Hoadley may refer to:

George Hoadley (Ohio politician) (1781–1857), mayor of New Haven, Connecticut, and Cleveland, Ohio
George Hoadley (Alberta politician) (1866–1955), provincial politician and rancher from Alberta, Canada

See also
George Hoadly (1826–1902), Democratic politician, 36th Governor of Ohio
George Hoadley Jr. House, a historic house in Cincinnati, Ohio